Skip Manning (born April 23, 1945) is a former NASCAR driver from Bogalusa, Louisiana. He competed in seventy-nine Winston Cup events in his career, spanning from 1975 to 1979. Manning won the rookie-of-the-year award in 1976. He had sixteen top-ten finishes during his career, with his best finish a 3rd at the Talladega Superspeedway in 1977.

Manning retired from NASCAR racing and returned to Bogalusa, Louisiana, with his wife Gloria Manning.

References

External links
 

1945 births
Living people
NASCAR drivers
People from Bogalusa, Louisiana
Racing drivers from Louisiana